HMS M16  was a First World War Royal Navy  monitor.

Design
In addition to her 9.2 inch gun, she also possessed one 12 pounder and one six pound anti-aircraft gun. She was equipped with Triple Expansion steam engines rated to 800 horse power that allowed a top speed of eleven knots. The monitor's crew consisted of sixty nine officers and men.

Construction
HMS M16 was ordered in March, 1915, as part of the War Emergency Programme of ship construction. She was laid down at the William Gray shipyard at Hartlepool in March 1915, launched on 3 May 1915, and completed in June 1915.

World War 1
M16 served in the Mediterranean from July 1915 to October 1918.

Disposal
M16 was sold on 29 January 1920 for mercantile service as an oil tanker with Anglo Saxon Petroleum Co, and renamed 'Tiga'.

Citations

References
 
 Dittmar, F. J. & Colledge, J. J., "British Warships 1914-1919", (Ian Allan, London, 1972), 

 

M15-class monitors
1915 ships
World War I monitors of the United Kingdom
Royal Navy ship names